The 1984 United States Senate election in Iowa was held on November 6, 1984. Incumbent Republican Senator Roger Jepsen ran for re-election to a second term in office. Jepsen was opposed by U.S. Representative Tom Harkin, from Iowa's 5th congressional district, who won the Democratic primary uncontested. The general election was full of mudslinging and personal attacks, including the embellishment by both candidates of their military records; Harkin attacked Jepsen for failing to keep his promise to not sell AWACS aircraft to Saudi Arabia. Ultimately, Harkin defeated Jepsen by a comfortable margin of nearly 12 points, winning the first of five terms in the Senate.

Democratic primary

Candidates
 Tom Harkin, United States Congressman from Iowa's 5th congressional district

Results

Republican primary

Candidates
 Roger Jepsen, incumbent U.S. Senator

Results

General election

Results

See also 
 1984 United States Senate elections

References

Iowa
1984
1984 Iowa elections